Gol Afshan (also Romanized as Gol Afshān) is a village in Aliabad Rural District, in the Central District of Qaem Shahr County, Mazandaran Province, Iran. At the 2006 census, its population was 302, in 93 families.

References 

Populated places in Qaem Shahr County